There are over 9,000 Grade I listed buildings in England. This page is a list of these buildings in the district of West Devon in Devon.

West Devon

|}

Notes

West
Borough of West Devon
Lists of Grade I listed buildings in Devon